Rhipidarctia lutea is a moth in the family Erebidae. It was described by William Jacob Holland in 1893. It is found in the Democratic Republic of the Congo and Gabon.

References

Moths described in 1893
Syntomini